Saint Michael originally refers to the archangel Michael, who appears in the Bible as a heavenly being.

Saint Michael or Saint Michaels may also refer to:

Saints
 Michael Maleinos (c. 894–963), Byzantine monk

Saints of the Roman Catholic Church

 Michael de Sanctis (1591–1625), Spanish Trinitarian
 Michel Garicoïts (1797–1863), French Basque founder of the Society of Priests of the Sacred Heart of Betharram
 Michael Hồ Đình Hy (1808–1857), Vietnamese martyr
 Michał Kozal (1893–1943), Polish bishop and martyr
 Michał Sopoćko (1888–1975), Polish confessor of saint Faustina Kowalska and Apostle of Divine Mercy

Saints of the Eastern Orthodox Church
 Michael I of Kiev (metropolitan), first metropolitan of Kiev and All Russia (died 992)
 Mikhail of Tver (1271–1318), Grand Prince of Vladimir
 Michael of Klopsk, Russian monk (died c. 1458)

Organisations
 Order of Saint Michael, a French chivalric order
 Order of St. Michael (Bavaria), a Bavarian chivalric order
 Order of St Michael and St George, a British chivalric order
 Pilgrims of Saint Michael, a Roman Catholic organization in Canada

Places

United Kingdom

Settlements
 Barford St Michael, Oxfordshire
 Creech St Michael, Somerset
 Gussage St Michael, Dorset
 Kington St Michael, Chippenham, Wiltshire
 Ormesby St Michael, Norfolk
 Seavington St Michael, Somerset
 St Michael Caerhays, Cornwall
 St Michael Penkevil, Cornwall
 St Michael's Hamlet, Merseyside
 St Michaels railway station
 St Michael's on Wyre, Lancashire
 St Michaels, Kent
 Stoke St Michael, Somerset

Other places
 St. Michael's, Coventry, an electoral ward in Coventry, West Midlands
St Michael's (Liverpool ward), a Liverpool City Council ward
 St Michael's Isle, Isle of Man
 St Michael's, Manchester
 St Michael's Mount, an island in Cornwall
 St Michael's Street, Oxford, a street in Oxford

United States
 St. Michael, Alaska
 St. Michael Island, the island on which the city of St. Michael is located
 St. Michael, Minnesota
 Saint Michael, Nebraska
 Saint Michael, North Dakota
 St. Michael-Sidman, Pennsylvania
 St. Michaels, Arizona
 Saint Michaels, Maryland
 Saint Michaels, Wisconsin
 St. Michael, US Virgin Islands

Elsewhere
 Mont-Saint-Michel (Saint Michael's Mount, Normandy, France)
 Saint Michael, Austria, a village in lower Austria
 Saint Michael, Barbados
 St. Michael's Cave, Gibraltar
 St. Michaels, County Cork, a civil parish of Ireland
 St. Michaels, County Kildare, a civil parish of Ireland
 St. Michaels, County Wexford, a civil parish of Ireland
 St Michael's-on-sea, a seaside village in KwaZulu-Natal, South Africa 
 St Michaels, a suburb of Brackenfell, South Africa 
 St. Michael, Alberta, a hamlet in Alberta, Canada
 St Michael's, common English name for São Miguel Island, Azores

Churches
 Cathedral of Saint Michael (disambiguation)
 St. Michael's Church (disambiguation)
 St. Michael's Episcopal Church (disambiguation)
 San Miguel Cathedral (disambiguation)

 St Michael's Abbey, Farnborough, Hampshire, UK
 St Michael at Germia, Byzantine shrine in Turkey
 Saint Michael's Basilica, Bordeaux, France
 St. Michael's Basilica, Miramichi, Chatham, New Brunswick, Canada
 St. Michael Chapel, Košice, Slovakia
 St Michael's Chapel, a ruined chapel, Faslane, Scotland
 St. Michael's Golden-Domed Monastery, Kiev, Ukraine
 Saint Michael Parish, Denmark
 Mount Saint Michael, a Catholic church establishment in Spokane, Washington, United States

Other structures
 Fort Saint Michael, Malta
 Saint Michael's Castle, a former royal residence, St. Petersburg, Russia
 St. Michael's Hospital (disambiguation)
 Saint Michael's Bus Terminal, a bus terminal in Whampoa, Singapore

Education
 St. Michael Academy (disambiguation)
 St. Michael's College (disambiguation) 
 St. Michael's School (disambiguation)
 St. Michael's Institution, Ipoh, Malaysia
 St. Michaels University School, Victoria, Canada
 Institution Saint-Michel, Solesmes, France

Sports
 Boldmere St. Michaels F.C., England
 St. Michael's A.F.C., a junior association football club in Tipperary, Republic of Ireland
 St. Michael's Buzzers, a Tier II Junior "A" ice hockey team from Toronto, Ontario, Canada
 St Michael's GAA (disambiguation), several Gaelic games clubs
 Mississauga St. Michael's Majors, an Ontario Hockey League (Canada) team that moved to Mississauga from Toronto in 2007
 Toronto St. Michael's Majors, an OHA/OHL team that had been in Toronto, Canada, for 100 years
 St. Michael's College School Arena, Toronto, Canada

Other
 St. Michael the Archangel (catamaran), a pre-modern Western multi-hull ship
 St. Michael (Raphael), a painting composed in 1504
 St Michael (brand), a former brand of British retailer Marks & Spencer

See also
 Saint-Michel (disambiguation), French
 San Miguel (disambiguation), Spanish
 San Michele (disambiguation), Italian
 São Miguel (disambiguation), Portuguese
 Saint Michael and Saint George (disambiguation)